Thomas Le Fanu may refer to:
 Thomas Le Fanu (priest)
 Thomas Le Fanu (civil servant)